Jeannerot is a surname. Notable people with the surname include:

Claude Jeannerot (born 1945), French politician
Thomas Jeannerot (born 1984), French skydiver